Natural order could refer to:

Science 
 Natural order (philosophy), concept in philosophy
 Natural order hypothesis, hypotheses of second-language acquisition
 Ordo naturalis, Latin for "natural order" once used to describe plant families
 In enumeration, a natural ordering in which a set of items might be enumerated
 The natural order defined for the monus operation, on monoids and semirings

Music
 Natural Order (album), 1990 album by Hellbastard

Card games 
 Natural order (cards) refers to the standard ranking of cards within a suit e.g. from Ace (high) to Deuce (low) or Deuce (high) to Seven (low).

See also 
 Natural sort order